Horace Godfrey Watts (29 May 1901 – 5 April 1959) was the fifth Anglican Bishop of Caledonia in Canada.

Watts was educated at the University of Saskatchewan and ordained in 1926. He was a missionary priest in Honan, China and then Onishi, Japan. Later he was Field Secretary of the Missionary Society of the Church of England in Canada before his ordination to the episcopate in 1953.

References

1901 births
University of Saskatchewan alumni
Anglican bishops of Caledonia
20th-century Anglican Church of Canada bishops
1959 deaths